Codonopsis lanceolata, also called deodeok or lance asiabell, is a flowering plant native to East Asia (China, Japan, Korea, and the Russian Far East). It is a variety of bonnet bellflower.

Description
It is a hardy perennial climber that grows up to 1.5m tall. It has bell-shaped flowers that are purple inside and bloom from August to September. The seeds ripen from September to October. The flowers are hermaphroditic and are pollinated by bees and wasps.

Cultivation

It grows in moist areas in woodland on low hills or mountains at an elevation of 2001600m. The plant grows best in light and medium-well drained soils with plenty of moisture with a neutral to acidic pH and in full sun to semi-shade.

The leaves and roots of the plant are edible raw or cooked. The plant has many medical uses and is used to treat lung abscesses, milk-flow obstruction and inflamed boils, among many others.

Slugs and snails eat young shoots.

The plant is propagated by seed that are surface-sown onto ericaceous compost. Division is also possible, although great care must be taken as the plant is intolerant of root disturbance.

The plant is grown commercially in Hoengseong County, Gangwon Province, South Korea, where it is an important part of the local agriculture. However, many South Koreans grow a small amount in personal gardens.

Uses

Culinary

Korea
The roots of deodeok, are used in Korean cuisine. They are eaten both fresh and cooked. Grilled marinated deodeok, called deodeok-gui, is often served as a vegetarian main dish. Deodeok can be pan-fried as jeon, pickled as kimchi, or used in fusion dishes such as salads.

Medicinal
Codonopsis lanceolata is also used as a natural medicine.

References

External links
Codonopsis lanceolata page

Campanuloideae
Korean vegetables